Stan van den Hoven (born 22 November 1998) is a Dutch rugby union player, currently playing for the New England Free Jacks of Major League Rugby (MLR) and  in the National Provincial Championship. His preferred position is lock.

Professional career
Van den Hoven signed for Major League Rugby side New England Free Jacks for the 2022 Major League Rugby season.

References

External links
itsrugby.co.uk Profile

1998 births
Living people
Rugby union locks
Dutch rugby union players
Bay of Plenty rugby union players
New England Free Jacks players
Taranaki rugby union players